Configurators, also known as choice boards, design systems, toolkits, or co-design platforms, are responsible for guiding the user through the configuration process. Different variations are represented, visualized, assessed and priced which starts a learning-by-doing process for the user. While the term “configurator” or “configuration system” is quoted rather often in literature, it is used for the most part in a technical sense, addressing a software tool. The success of such an interaction system is, however, not only defined by its technological capabilities, but also by its integration in the whole sale environment, its ability to allow for learning by doing, to provide experience and process satisfaction, and its integration into the brand concept.

Advantages
Configurators can be found in various forms and different industries. They are employed in B2B (business to business), as well as B2C (business to consumer) markets and are operated either by trained staff or customers themselves. Whereas B2B configurators are primarily used to support sales and lift production efficiency, B2C configurators are often employed as design tools that allow customers to "co-design" their own products. This is reflected in different advantages according to usage:

For B2B:
Lower distribution costs
Quicker reaction to customer inquiries
Reduced capital commitment and less overproduction
Error elimination throughout the ordering and production process
Quality improvements in customer-service
Worldwide access to up-to-date product information
Reduction of item numbers
For B2C:
Differentiation through individuality
Reduced capital commitment and less overproduction
Better knowledge of customers' needs
Higher customer loyalty
Shopping as experience

Enabler of mass customization
Configurators enable mass customization, which depends on a deep and efficient integration of customers into value creation. Salvador et al. identified three fundamental capabilities determining the ability of a company to mass-customize its offering, i.e. solution space development, robust process design and choice navigation. Configurators serve as an important tool for choice navigation. Configurators have been widely used in e-Commerce. Examples can be found in different industries like accessories, apparel, automobile, food, industrial goods etc. The main challenge of choice navigation lies in the ability to support customers in identifying their own solutions while minimizing complexity and the burden of choice, i.e. improving the experience of customer needs, elicitation and interaction in a configuration process. Many efforts have been put along this direction to enhance the efficiency of configurator design, such as adaptive configurators(). The prediction is integrated into the configurator to improve the quality and speed of configuration process.  Configurators may also be used to limit or eliminate mass customization if intended to do so.  This is accomplished through limiting of allowable options in data models.

Existing configuration paradigms
Rule based: these systems derive solutions in a forward-chaining manner. At each step, the system examines the entire set of rules and considers only the rules it can execute next. Each rule carries its own complete triggering context, which identifies its scope of applicability. The system then selects and executes one of the rules under consideration by performing its action part. Most of early configuration systems fall in this category, like R1/XCON, Cossack and MICON. This kind of systems often suffers from the maintenance issues because of the lack of separation between domain knowledge and control strategy, especially when the configurator system is complex.
Model Based: the main assumption behind model based configurators is the existence of a system's model which consists of decomposable entities and interactions between their elements.
Case based: in case based configurators, the knowledge necessary for reasoning is stored mainly in cases that record a set of configurations sold to earlier customers. With the case based approach, one tries to solve the current configuration problem by finding a similar, previously solved problem and adapting it to the new requirements. The basic processing cycle in a case based configurator is: input customer requirements, retrieve a configuration and adapt the case to the new situation.

References

See also
 Mass customization
 Personalization
 Build to order
 Custom-Fit
 Dell
 Personalized marketing
 Product differentiation
 Product management
 Rapid manufacturing
 Knowledge-based Configuration

Computer configuration
Innovation
Product management
Decision-making